A serdab, literally meaning "cold water", which became a loanword in Arabic for 'cellar' is an ancient Egyptian tomb structure that served as a chamber for the Ka statue of a deceased individual. Used during the Old Kingdom, the serdab was a sealed chamber with a small slit or hole to allow the soul of the deceased to move about freely. These holes  also let in the smells of the offerings presented to the statue.

The term serdab is also used for a type of undecorated chamber found in many pyramids. Due to the lack of inscriptions, it has been impossible to determine the ritual function of this chamber, but many Egyptologists view it as a storage space, akin with the underground storehouses in private and royal tombs of the Second Dynasty. It is easiest recognized by its position in the east end of the pyramid's internal chamber system and the three niches in its outer wall. The earliest serdab of this type is found in the pyramid of Menkaure, but it was during the reign of Djedkare Isesi that it became a part of the standard pyramid layout.

References

Ancient Egyptian architecture
Persian words and phrases